This is a list of Swedish football transfers in the winter transfer window 2010–2011 by club.

Only transfers in and out between 1 January – 31 March 2011 of the Allsvenskan and Superettan are included.

On February 7, 2011, Örgryte IS and Qviding FIF announced plans for a possible merger of the two club in order to save Örgryte IS' failing economy, however this was later rejected on February 22. Meanwhile, on February 11, Örgryte IS filed for bankruptcy and it resulted in a forced relegation of the club to Division 1 Södra on February 16, while the club's position in Superettan was taken over by Qviding FIF. The transfers in the list below were done while Örgryte IS was still in the Superettan.

Allsvenskan

AIK

In:

Out:

BK Häcken

In:

Out:

Djurgårdens IF

In:

Out:

GAIS

In:

Out:

Gefle IF

In:

Out:

Halmstads BK

In:

Out:

Helsingborgs IF

In:

Out:

IF Elfsborg

In:

Out:

IFK Göteborg

In:

Out:

IFK Norrköping

In:

Out:

Kalmar FF

In:

Out:

Malmö FF

In:

Out:

Mjällby AIF

In:

Out:

Syrianska FC

In:

Out:

Trelleborgs FF

In:

Out:

Örebro SK

In:

Out:

Superettan

Assyriska FF

In:

Out:

Degerfors IF

In:

Out:

Falkenbergs FF

In:

Out:

GIF Sundsvall

In:

Out:

Hammarby IF

In:

Out:

IF Brommapojkarna

In:

Out:

IFK Värnamo

In:

Out:

IK Brage

In:

Out:

Jönköpings Södra IF

In:

Out:

Landskrona BoIS

In:

Out:

Ljungskile SK

In:

Out:

Qviding FIF
Club raised from Division 1 following Örgryte IS relegation on February 16, 2011

In:

Out:

Västerås SK

In:

Out:

Åtvidabergs FF

In:

Out:

Ängelholms FF

In:

Out:

Örgryte IS
Forced relegated to Division 1 Södra on February 16, 2011, transfers below were done while the club was still part of Superettan 

In:

Out:

Östers IF

In:

Out:

References

Allsvenskan references

Superettan references

External links
 Official site of the SvFF 

Trans
Trans
2010-11
Sweden